Christina Voß (born 7 July 1952) is a former East German handball player who competed in the 1976 Summer Olympics.

In 1976 she won the silver medal with the East German team. She played all five matches and scored six goals.

External links
profile

1952 births
Living people
German female handball players
Handball players at the 1976 Summer Olympics
Olympic handball players of East Germany
Olympic silver medalists for East Germany
Olympic medalists in handball
Medalists at the 1976 Summer Olympics